Yemelyanov or Emelyanov is a Russian masculine surname, its feminine counterpart is Yemelyanova or Emelyanova. It may refer to

Dmitri Yemelyanov (born 1972), Russian footballer
Ivan Yemelyanov (1861–1916), Russian revolutionary
Konstantin Yemelyanov (born 1970), Russian footballer
Mikhail Yemelyanov (born 1991), Kazakhstani sprint canoer
Roman Emelyanov (born 1975), Russian radio and television personality
Roman Yemelyanov (born 1992), Russian footballer
Sergei Yemelyanov (born 1981), Russian footballer
Stanislav Emelyanov (born 1990), Russian race walker
Vadim Yemelyanov (1942–1977), Soviet boxer
Viktor Yemelyanov (born 1987), Russian footballer
Vladimir Yemelyanov (1911–1975), Soviet actor
Yulia Emelyanova (born 1975), Ukrainian football player

See also
Emelyanov KIM-3 Stakanovets, Soviet sailplane

Russian-language surnames